General elections were held in Jordan on 20 October 1947.  As political parties were banned at the time, all candidates were independents.

References

Transjordan
General election
Election and referendum articles with incomplete results
Elections in Jordan
Transjordan
Transjordan